F43 may refer to:

Ships 
 , a Niterói-class frigate of the Brazilian Navy
 , a Tribal-class destroyer of the Royal Navy
 , a Whitby-class frigate of the Royal Navy
 , a Talwar-class frigate of the Indian Navy

Other uses 
 Downtown Airport (Arkansas), in El Dorado, Arkansas